LABR was the first high-profile fantasy sports experts league of its kind. Formed by John Hunt, the fantasy baseball columnist for USA Today Baseball Weekly, the league was first formed in 1994 and featured such celebrities as Peter Gammons, Keith Olbermann and Bill James.
LABR stands for League of Alternative Baseball Reality and was given that nickname and the pronunciation ("labor") by Olbermann as a play on words with the labor strike in baseball at that time. Hunt ran the league and published the results of the LABR league in the Baseball Weeklys (now USA Today Sports Weekly) fantasy baseball preview issue each March from 1994 through 2006. He opted not to return for the 2007 league and was replaced with in-house staff. The dollar values players were sold for in the fantasy league are used as a benchmark for readers in their own fantasy drafts.

The LABR has lost its early status as the premier experts' league, as in 1997 a rival fantasy baseball experts league, Tout Wars, was created by Ron Shandler, who was fed up with the lack of promotion USA Today gave the LABR league.

The LABR Mixed league, AL-Only league and NL-Only league are online and can be viewed by the general public.

The 2020 Major League Baseball season was a 60-game pandemic shortened season.  LABR auctions and drafts occurred during Spring Training before the pandemic shutdown.

Scoring Rules

LABR uses a Ranked, Rotisserie Based Scoring System of 5 batting categories and 5 pitching categories (5x5).

If there are N teams in the LABR, N points shall be awarded for first place in a category, N-1 for second place, down to 1 point for last place. In the event of a tie, the points will be split. Points will be aggregated over all ten scoring categories (see below). The team with the most points wins.

Example: LABR has 15 teams. Team A has the most home runs, and is awarded 15 points in that category. Teams B and C are tied for second in home runs; they split the second and third place points, and each receive 13.5 points. If a team finished first in all 10 categories, it would receive a total of 15*10=150 points. If it finished last in all categories, it would receive 1*10=10 points. 
In the case of ties in total points, the final places in the standings are determined by comparing the placement of the teams in the individual categories. The team ahead in a category is given a point. This is done over all categories. The team with the most points is declared the winner. Should the teams still be tied after this process, then the final result shall be declared a tie.

Batting Categories 
 Batting Average 
 Runs 
 Home Runs 
 Runs Batted In 
 Stolen Bases

Pitching Categories
 Wins 
 Earned Run Average 
 WHIP (Walks+Hits)/(Innings Pitched) 
 Strikeouts 
 Saves

Each team will be required to attain a minimum of 950 innings pitched in order to qualify for placement in the pitching categories of; a) Ratio and b) Earned Run Average, and a minimum of 4,200 at-bats for placement in the batting average category. If these minimum innings or at-bats are not achieved the team will receive 1 point in these categories and every team that meets the minimum innings pitched or at-bats will be ranked in the standings with 15 points for 1st place and so on until all qualifying teams have received points.

Rosters

Rosters shall consist of a lineup of 23 players and a bench of 6 reserve players.

A team's active roster consists of the following players: 5 outfielders, 2 catchers, 1 second baseman, 1 shortstop, 1 middle infielder (either second baseman or shortstop), 1 first baseman, 1 third baseman, 1 corner infielder (first or third baseman), one utility player who may be of any position and 9 pitchers (who may be either starters, relievers or both).

There will also be six reserve players on each team's roster to be selected on draft day. Players who go onto the disabled list may also be reserved on a separate list. There is no limit to the number of disabled list players that can exist on a roster.

Only members of the active roster generate statistics.

Results

References

Baseball culture
Fantasy sports
1994 establishments in the United States